Sanjin Kalaica (born July 22, 1969) is a former Croatian professional basketball player.

References

External links
 

Living people
1969 births
Croatian men's basketball players
Point guards